Coedpoeth United Football Club are a football club based in Coedpoeth, Wrexham County Borough. They currently play in the North East Wales Football League Premier Division.

Early history
The first football club in Coedpoeth was Lloftwen, of whom there are reports in January 1878. The next club in the village was Equitable who formed around 1880, and folded around 1884. Equitable entered the Welsh Cup in 1881. A club called Coedpoeth also existed at the same time and competed in the Welsh Cup from 1882–1884. Given that both these clubs seem to have appeared and disappeared at the same times, it is possible that they were the same club, using interchangeable names depending on the reporter.

In 1884 there are reports of a team called White Stars (Coedpoeth), whilst in 1887 there are reports of a team called North End (Coedpoeth) who played at a ground called The Terrace.

The short-lived Minera Rovers and Minera Victoria (named for a neighbouring village) contested the Welsh Amateur Cup in 1890 and 1891. By 1892 Adwy United had emerged to represent the area. Adwy United reached the semi-final of the Welsh Amateur Cup in 1895. By 1898 they were joined in the Denbighshire League by another local team, Minera St Marys. Minera St Marys only lasted one season in this competition, taking on the fixtures of Cerney Swifts and finishing second from bottom.

Adwy United were more competitive in the Denbighshire League, finishing third in 1899. They also won the St Martins Cup, beating St Martins 5–0 at The Racecourse, Wrexham. There are reports of Adwy United playing in "the same coloured jerseys" as Chirk. Whilst this does not provide a definite answer on what colours Adwy United wore, it is documented that Chirk played in white and blue.

Adwy United withdrew from the Denbighshire League in 1900 and merged with Coedpoeth Victoria to form Adwy Victoria. This team finished second in the Denbighshire League in 1901.

Coedpoeth United were first mentioned in 1907 when they joined the Wrexham & District League. They finished second in the Second Division and were promoted to the First Division for the 1908–09 season, when they finished third. The 1908–09 season also saw the introduction of a Coedpoeth United Reserves team in the Second Division, who were joined in the league by another team from the village, Coedpoeth St Davids. In 1909 the team also reached the final of the Denbighshire & Flintshire Charity Cup, and St Martins Cup. Coedpoeth United withdrew from the Wrexham & District League in 1910.

This is the last record of any football teams in Coedpoeth prior to World War One.

Seasons

Inter-war period
Following the end of hostilities Adwy White Stars competed for one season in the 1919-20 Ffrith & District League, a league in which Coedpoeth Athletic competed in the following season. Coedpoeth United re-emerged in 1920 in the North Wales Alliance League Division 2, a competition in which they finished as runners up, only missing out on being champions on goals scored. From 1921–1924 Coedpoeth entered the newly formed Welsh National League (North). Between 1935–1938 the club competed in the Wrexham & District League.

Seasons

Post War Period
Following the end of World War II, Coedpoeth re-emerged in the newly formed Welsh National League Wrexham Area East. They were Champions of the East Division in 1948 and 1949. The 1949 League winning team had a 100% record, and was promoted to Welsh National League Wrexham Area Division 1. The club stayed in Division 1 for two seasons, before being relegated in 1951. The club finished as Runners Up in Division 2 in 1953 achieving Promotion back to Division 1. The team was immediately relegated again, and played a final season in Division 2 before folding at the end of the 1955 season.

Seasons

Coedpoeth Sports Club FC

In 1964, almost a decade after the previous Coedpoeth team had folded, Coedpoeth Sports Club entered Welsh National League Wrexham Area Division 3. Managed by Councillor Bob Squire, Coedpoeth SC were immediately successful and were champions in their first season, gaining promotion to Division 2. Their stay in Division 2 lasted two seasons; in 1967 they were champions and promoted again. The club lasted five seasons in Division 1 before finishing 15th in 1972 and dropping two tiers back to Division 3. The club initially struggled back in Division 3, however in 1974 Coedpoeth SC were champions and promoted. 1976 saw the club complete a League and Cup double as they won Division 2 alongside the Horace Wynne Cup. The club finished 10th back in Division 1, however the club folded once again in 1977 after being knocked out of the Welsh Cup in the Qualifying Round.

Seasons

1980s
Coedpoeth once again reformed for the start of the 1980–81 season and finished second in Welsh National League Wrexham Area Division 4, but were not promoted. The following season the club were champions of Division 4. This marked the beginning of an astonishing rise, as the club claimed the Division 3 title at its first attempt, and finished as Division 2 runners-up straight away too. The club finished 13th in its first season in Division 1 and was subsequently relegated. In 1985 the club was managed by former Wrexham, Liverpool and Chester player Stuart Mason. The club remained in Division 2 before folding in 1989.

Seasons

Recent history

The current Adult section of the club reformed in 1999 and joined the Welsh National League.

Steve Wilk took over as manager from Steve Jones at the start of the 2011–12 season. They finished up 3rd in the league in his first season in charge. In 2012–13, the club reached its first senior cup final for many years, losing 1–0 in the WNL Premier Division final to local rivals, Brymbo at Cefn Druids. Coedpoeth United FC finished in 8th place in the league in the season ended 2012–13.

Steve Wilk remained in charge for the start of the 2013–14 season assembling arguably the strongest squad on paper they had for many years. After a tough first round of games, with only one point on the board after 6 games, Steve Wilk resigned. Steve Jones stepped back into management (after a brief unhappy spell at Brymbo) to bring the team up to finish away from the relegation zone in 11th place.

Dur to new work commitments, Steve Jones was unable to continue as manager for the start of the 2014–15 season and so long serving player John Griffiths stepped in to become player/manager with Andy Pryde as his player assistant.

The 2015–16 season saw the appointment of former Everton, Wrexham and Wales international Dave Smallman as manager, however Smallman left after only a few games and was replaced by long time player, and reserves coach Karl Fenlon.

The 2018-19 season was looking promising for the young U-19 squad managed by Karl Thomas and his assistant Jack Pawley, coming 2nd in the league the previous season, Karl's team was looking to fulfill everyone's expectations and finally win a senior trophy after a long 14 year wait. After a difficult but solid league campaign, Karl's squad managed to win the league title while losing just 2 games and drawing once.

Seasons
For a full history see; List of football seasons involving Coedpoeth and Minera teams

The club joined the newly formed North East Wales Football League in 2020 as a Premier Division club.

Honours

League
Welsh National League Premier Division
Third (1): 2011

U-19 Queensferry Sports Flintshire Junior & Youth Football League
Winner (1): 2019
Runner Up (1): 2018

Welsh National League Division One
Winner (2): 1967, 1976
Runner Up (3): 1953, 1984, 2005
Third (1) : 1966
Welsh National League Division Two
Winner (4): 1965, 1974, 1983, 2004
Welsh National League Division Three
Winner (1): 1982
Runner Up (1): 1981

Welsh National League East Division
Winner (2): 1948, 1949

North Wales Alliance League Division Two
Runner Up (1): 1921

Cups
Welsh National League Premier Division Cup
Runner Up: 2013

North East Wales FA Junior (Horace Wynne) Cup

Winner: 1976
Runner Up: 2009

Denbighshire and Flintshire Charity Cup
Runner Up (1): 1909
Semi Finalists: 1908

St. Martins Cup
Runner Up (1): 1909

References 

Football clubs in Wales
Welsh National League (Wrexham Area) Premier Division clubs
Sport in Wrexham County Borough
Football clubs in Wrexham
North East Wales Football League clubs
North Wales Alliance League clubs